The B1110 runs for about  between Holt and Dereham, and is entirely within the county of Norfolk. The road is a link between the A148 and the A47 at the town of Dereham.

History
This ancient route predates the Norman Conquest and was used by pilgrims who travelled between the Saxon cathedral, seat of the Bishop of East Anglia, at North Elmham and the abbey at Walsingham and Binham Priory. This ancient road also can be seen very clearly on William Faden's map of Norfolk which was surveyed between 1790 and 1794. This map, the first large-scale map (at one inch to the mile) of the whole county, is a record of the landscape and transport system of the county of Norfolk in late 18th century, and shows that despite the Parliamentary Enclosure of the early 19th century the route has changed very little. Much of the route on the map is highlighted in a pale pink which marks it out as an important artery of the time.

Destinations
Travelling from north-northeast to south, the road passes through:
Thornage
Briningham
Swanton Novers
Guist
Broom Green
North Elmham
Dereham

References

Roads in England
Transport in Norfolk